Hüseyin Kökseçen (born 26 January 1988), better known as KC Rebell, is a German rapper of Kurdish descent. Based in Essen, Germany, he has an own label imprint "Rebell Army". He released six albums, four of which have peaked at number one on the German Albums Chart.

Discography

Albums

Collaborative albums

Mixtapes
2011: Hoodmoney Freetape
2011: Hoodmoney Freetape 2
2012: RapRebell

Singles

Featured in

Other charted songs

References

German rappers
1988 births
Living people
People from Pazarcık
German people of Turkish descent
German people of Kurdish descent